Paula Marosi (3 November 1936 – 4 March 2022) was a Hungarian fencer. She won a gold medal in the women's team foil event at the 1964 Summer Olympics. She won a silver in the same event at the 1968 Summer Olympics. 

Marosi died in Budapest on 4 March 2022, at the age of 85.

References

External links
 

1936 births
2022 deaths
Hungarian female foil fencers
Olympic fencers of Hungary
Fencers at the 1964 Summer Olympics
Fencers at the 1968 Summer Olympics
Olympic gold medalists for Hungary
Olympic silver medalists for Hungary
Fencers from Budapest
Olympic medalists in fencing
Medalists at the 1964 Summer Olympics
Medalists at the 1968 Summer Olympics
20th-century Hungarian women